Pluck is an unincorporated community in Polk County, Texas, United States.

History
A variant name was "Stryker." A post office called Stryker was established in 1885, and closed in 1913, and a post office called Pluck was in operation from 1918 until 1951. The origin of the name "Pluck" is obscure.

References

Unincorporated communities in Polk County, Texas
Unincorporated communities in Texas